El Retrato is a 1947 Argentine film.

Cast
 Mirtha Legrand       
  Francisco Barletta   
 Héctor Calcaño       
 Alberto de Mendoza       
 Carlos Enríquez       
 Mario Faig       
 Aurelia Ferrer       
 Alberto Bello       
 Osvaldo Miranda       
 Horacio O'Connor       
 Sara Olmos       
 Santiago Rebull      
 María Santos       
 Alberto Terrones       
 Juan Carlos Thorry

External links
 

1947 films
1940s Spanish-language films
Argentine black-and-white films
Argentine comedy films
1947 comedy films
1940s Argentine films